Daniel Zildjian Garon Benitez (born April 23, 1997), popularly known as Zild, is a Filipino musician, producer, and singer-songwriter. He is currently the lead vocalist, pianist/keyboardist, synth player and bassist of IV of Spades.

Personal life
Zild Benitez is the son of Frank Benitez, the former drummer of Hungry Young Poets and Barbie's Cradle. Zild spent his high school years in Don Alejandro Roces Sr. Science High School in Quezon City. He graduated at De La Salle-College of St. Benilde in 2018 with a Bachelor of Arts degree in Music Production.

During his childhood and teenage years, he became a commercial model for various brands in the Philippines, including Lucky Me! Pancit Canton, Coca-Cola, and Nido. He also had a cameo role in one of ABS-CBN's primetime like "Got to Believe".

Career

IV of Spades

In June 2014, Allan Mitchell Silonga decided to form a band for his son Blaster, who would become the band's lead guitarist. The Silongas were able to recruit drummer Badjao de Castro and bassist Zildjian "Zild" Benitez, who are the sons of Allan's friends. Unique Salonga, Benitez's churchmate who was already writing his own music, was later recruited to become the band's lead singer.

The band later signed to Warner Music Philippines and released their first single "Ilaw sa Daan".

On 2018, IV of Spades won the New Artist of the Year and the MYX Bandarito Performance of the Year and Nominated as Group the Year at the annual Myx Music Awards. The band also won the Dreams Come True with Air Asia, the airline's search for the most promising acts in the region. The band performed with David Foster as part of their prize. They also won the Favorite New Group award at the 30th annual Awit Awards.

Currently, Benitez handles the responsibility as the lead vocalist after their former lead vocalist Unique Salonga left to pursue "personal endeavors". Months later, the band released their debut studio album, ClapClapClap!, on January 18, 2019.

Manila Magic
He is also a member of electronic pop duo Manila Magic, with Tim Marquez of One Click Straight.

Solo Career
On August 13, 2016, Benitez joined a music competition named "Music Hero" in the noontime show Eat Bulaga!. He originally won the "Bass Hero" title, but due to IV of Spades' rise to fandom, he and his bandmate, Blaster Silonga, who also won the "Electric Guitar Hero" title, left their titles and gave it up.

On June 12, 2020, Benitez released the music video of "Sinungaling" on YouTube. Few weeks later, he also released "Dila", along with its music video on July 9, 2020. On August 6, 2020, he released his debut solo album titled "Homework Machine". It features "Sinungaling" and "Dila" which were released beforehand.

Benitez signed an artist management contract with Rico Blanco's label/management Balcony Entertainment.

On February 10, 2021, Benitez released "Kyusi" with its music video on YouTube. Weeks later, he released "Apat" on February 25, he also revealed that "Kyusi" and "Apat" will be part of his upcoming album titled "Huminga", which was released on April 8, 2021.

According to his Spotify profile, Benitez started to produce his own songs using the isolation time from the COVID-19 pandemic.

In August 2022, Benitez officially signed with UMG Philippines thru Island Records Philippines label.

Discography

Albums
As a Solo Artist

with IV of Spades

Singles
as a Solo Artist

as a Featured Artist

with Manila Magic

with IV of Spades

Music videos

Accolades

References

External links
 

Filipino rock musicians
21st-century Filipino male singers
Filipino songwriters
Living people
ABS-CBN personalities
1997 births
Singers from Manila
Warner Music Philippines artists